Saninskogo DOKa is a rural locality (a settlement) in Nagornoye Rural Settlement, Petushinsky District, Vladimir Oblast, Russia. The population was 518 as of 2010. There are 6 streets.

Geography 
Saninskogo DOKa is located 45 km northwest of Petushki (the district's administrative centre) by road. Sanino is the nearest rural locality.

References 

Rural localities in Petushinsky District